Brewster Academy is a co-educational independent boarding school located on  in Wolfeboro, New Hampshire, United States. It occupies  of shoreline along Lake Winnipesaukee. With around 350 students, it serves grades nine through twelve and post-graduates. The 2018 full boarding tuition is $62,600. The current Head of School is Kristy Kerin.

History

The school was founded in 1820 by local citizens as a "building for higher education". Originally called the "Wolfeboro & Tuftonboro Academy", in 1887 it was renamed "Brewster Free Academy" in honor of benefactor John Brewster. For sixty years it charged no tuition fee to local residents, and, from its inception until 1964, the school served as the only high school in Wolfeboro, as well as serving day students from neighboring towns. In 1946, the academy begin to charge a small tuition, and Wolfeboro at its town meeting in March 1947 voted to pay local students' tuition fees. During the immediate postwar years, it was a popular school with military veterans seeking to improve their credentials for a university education under the G.I. Bill. In 1963 the graduating class consisted of 60 local students, with 30 additional post-graduate students who boarded on campus. Many were there to increase their athletic prowess, and some, including Milt Morin who played in the NFL, had successful college and pro sports careers. The local students were then moved to Kingswood Regional High School in town and Brewster became a private boarding school.

In 1985, Digital Equipment Corporation co-founder Ken Olsen donated a number of Digital personal computers to Brewster. The computers were part of a new lab dedicated to Grace Murray Hopper, whose family had a summer house in Wolfeboro. The lab is called the Grace Murray Hopper Center for Computer Learning.

Brewster has hosted the Great Waters Music Festival since 1995. This summer festival promotes live musical performances including choral, symphonic, folk, pops, jazz, Broadway, dance, and renowned vocal and instrumental artists. Celebrity performers have included Wynton Marsalis, Dave Brubeck, Arlo Guthrie, Chuck Mangione, and the Glenn Miller Orchestra.

In 2020, Brewster's prep basketball team won their 7th National Prep Basketball Championship (2010; 2012; 2104; 2015; 2017; 2019; 2020). Eighteen alumni have played in the NBA, including 10 who have been selected in the NBA draft since 2010.

On July 1, 2021, Kristy Kerin became the 13th Head of School in Brewster's over 200-year history. Notably, she is the first female to hold the position.

Technology

Brewster Academy began its one-to-one laptop program in 1993. Each new freshman or sophomore admission to Brewster receives an Apple laptop on arrival and this laptop will be with them for the remainder of their time at the academy. Juniors and seniors are expected to provide their own laptop unless special financial or other aid is given. Most classes require software tools for students' work and to ensure constant communication among students, parents and administrators. Through online portfolios, students post their work to be reviewed and evaluated by faculty, and shared with parents. Through their own portal, grades and academic status are constantly posted to all students.

Faculty
Most members of the faculty live around campus with their families. Some are dorm parents, who take care of students in dorm. Dorm parents have dorm meetings once a week to discuss problems in student's life in dorm. Most of the married dorm parents live with their families in quarters connected to the dorm.

The faculty is prepared and trained at the Brewster Summer Institute, a four-week professional development program designed to assist teachers in accelerating student growth. Each instructor is placed on an eight-member team that teaches and advises students in a single grade. Teams meet three or four times weekly to discuss each student's progress and performance. Class size averages 12, and the student-teacher ratio is 6:1.

Athletics
Brewster Academy provides various afternoon sport programs, such as soccer, basketball, lacrosse, field hockey, ice hockey, or tennis, with members of faculty coaching them. Brewster has a diverse selection of interscholastic sports along with recreational, intramural and instructional sports during the fall, winter and spring seasons. Among the interscholastic sports, Brewster fields varsity, junior varsity and co-ed teams, as well as eight- and four-person shells on the crew teams. Games are typically played on Wednesdays and Saturdays, with a half day of classes on Wednesdays to accommodate games schedules. During games and during regular practices, an athletic trainer is available to help students. The teams are coached by members of faculty at all levels.

Brewster competes in the following interscholastic sports: alpine skiing, baseball, basketball, cross country running, cross-country skiing, field hockey, ice hockey, lacrosse, crew, softball, sailing, snowboarding, soccer, and tennis. Intramural, recreational and instructional offerings include advanced strength training, dance, equestrianism, golf, outdoor skills, snow sports, tennis, ultimate Frisbee, x-fitness, and yoga.

The academy holds numerous New England and Lakes Region League Championship titles.

The boys' prep basketball team has won the National Prep School Championship seven times (2010; 2012; 2014; 2015; 2017; 2019; 2020) and the NEPSAC Class AAA Championship seven times (2008; 2010; 2013; 2014; 2015; 2017; 2022). The program has sent approximately 170 alumni to NCAA Division I programs over the past 20 years. Twenty Brewster Academy alumni have played in the NBA, while 12 alumni have been selected in the NBA Draft.

The boys' lacrosse team has won numerous Lakes Region Championships, as well as consistently ranking nationally in LaxPower and US Lacrosse polls. Numerous alumni have moved on to play in college and professionally.

Athletic facilities include a  athletics and wellness center featuring a convertible turf floor, a four-lane 200-meter indoor track, and a fitness center; six playing fields; nine tennis courts; a boathouse for dry land training for the sailing and crew teams; an indoor rowing tank; and a climbing wall.

Arts
In the performing arts, Brewster has an award-winning chorus, HOWL, which has performed at Carnegie Hall and a drama group that produces musicals, operas and plays throughout the year. There is a chamber orchestra, a chorale, a wind ensemble and a jazz band, and dance instruction is available. An art center is home to ceramics, printmaking, drawing and painting classes. Multimedia and desktop publishing centers feature the latest computers, industry standard software, and video and digital equipment. The newly renovated Anderson Hall, designed by Scott Simons Architects, features a proscenium theater, new lobby and green room. Scott Simons Architects received the AIA NH Honor Award for the design in 2015.

Notable alumni

Jalen Adams (born 1995), basketball player for Hapoel Jerusalem in the Israeli Basketball Premier League
 Jeff Adrien, basketball player for the UConn Huskies and Milwaukee Bucks
 Doğuş Balbay, basketball player for Anadolu Efes
 Will Barton, basketball player for the Denver Nuggets
 Jonah Bolden, basketball player for Philadelphia 76ers
 Craig Brackins, basketball player for the Philadelphia 76ers
 Terrence Clarke, former college basketball player for Kentucky Wildcats
 Marcus Derrickson, basketball player for Golden State Warriors
 Melvin Ejim (born 1991), small forward for Budućnost
 C. J. Fair, former small forward for the Syracuse Orange
 Daniel Ford, novelist, journalist, historian
 Topher Grace, actor
 Devonte' Graham, basketball player for the New Orleans Pelicans
 Charles Hoag, Classical scholar
 James Kirkwood, Jr., author; his novel Good Times Bad Times is set at Brewster, although the school and its buildings are renamed
 Jalen Lecque, guard for the Phoenix Suns
Mark Lyons (born 1989), basketball player, top scorer in the Israel Basketball Premier League in both 2015 and 2017
 Mitch McGary, power forward for the Oklahoma City Thunder
 Donovan Mitchell, NBA All-Star, first-round selection in 2017 NBA draft
 Milt Morin, NFL player
 Hosea Quimby, Free Will Baptist minister and educator
 Jalen Reynolds (born 1992), basketball player for Maccabi Tel Aviv of the Israeli Basketball Premier League and Euroleague.
 Thomas Robinson, basketball player for the Portland Trail Blazers
 JaKarr Sampson, basketball player for the Indiana Pacers
 Avi Schafer (born 1998), Japanese professional basketball player 
 Blake Schilb, basketball player for Paris-Levallois
 Justine Siegal, baseball coach and sports educator
 Xavier Silas, basketball player for the Philadelphia 76ers
 Justin Simon, basketball player for The Hawks of Wollongong, New South Wales
Jared Terrell (born 1995), basketball player in the Israeli Basketball Premier League
 T. J. Warren, forward for the Indiana Pacers

Residence halls
Students live in 20 dormitories with faculty members and their families. Most dormitories overlook Lake Winnipesaukee, New Hampshire's largest lake, and the Belknap Mountains in the distance.

References

External links
 Brewster Academy official website
 Historical Sketch, Brewster Free Academy (1919)
 The Association of Boarding Schools profile

Boarding schools in New Hampshire
Educational institutions established in 1820
Preparatory schools in New Hampshire
Private high schools in New Hampshire
Schools in Carroll County, New Hampshire
Wolfeboro, New Hampshire
Free Will Baptist schools